Hughes Point is a steep rock point on the west side of the terminus of Exum Glacier, in the Jones Mountains of Antarctica. It was mapped by the University of Minnesota Jones Mountains Party, 1960–61, and named by them for Wayne B. Hughes, Assistant United States Antarctic Research Program Representative at McMurdo Station, 1960–61.

References

Headlands of Ellsworth Land